Daimio is a  subgenus of Palearctic spread-winged skippers in the family Hesperiidae.

References
Natural History Museum Lepidoptera genus database
Daimio at funet

External links
Images representing Daimio  at  Consortium for the Barcode of Life

Tagiadini
Taxa named by Richard Paget Murray